John Wu Shi-zhen (January 19, 1921 – August 25, 2014) was a Chinese Roman Catholic archbishop.

Born in China, Wu Shi-zhen was ordained a priest  in 1949. On September 6, 1987, he was clandestinely consecrated as bishop, and from 1990 to 2011 was an archbishop ordinary of the Roman Catholic Archdiocese of Nanchang.

References

1921 births
2014 deaths
21st-century Roman Catholic archbishops in China
20th-century Roman Catholic archbishops in China
Chinese Roman Catholic archbishops